Alexander Macleod (c. 1715–1790), of Harris, Inverness and Theobalds, Hertfordshire, was a British politician.

He was a Member (MP) of the Parliament of Great Britain for Honiton 1780 - 27 March 1781.

References

1715 births
1790 deaths
People from Harris, Outer Hebrides
People from Cheshunt
British MPs 1780–1784
Members of the Parliament of Great Britain for Honiton